Anthony William Brown (born July 29, 1960) is an American professional basketball coach and former player. He formerly played in the NBA and internationally after a collegiate career with the Arkansas Razorbacks. Brown served as the interim head coach of the Brooklyn Nets in 2016.

Playing career
The New Jersey Nets selected Brown in the fourth round of the 1982 NBA Draft as the 82nd overall pick. He played for nine NBA teams in seven seasons and also played in the CBA and overseas with Reggio Emilia in Italy from 1992 to 1994.

NBA career statistics

Regular season

|-
| align="left" | 1984–85
| align="left" | Indiana
| 82 || 36 || 19.3 || .460 || .000 || .678 || 3.5 || 1.9 || 0.7 || 0.1 || 6.6
|-
| align="left" | 1985–86
| align="left" | Chicago
| 10 || 0 || 13.2 || .439 || .000 || .692 || 1.6 || 1.4 || 0.5 || 0.1 || 4.5
|-
| align="left" | 1986–87
| align="left" | New Jersey
| 77 || 67 || 30.4 || .442 || .250 || .738 || 2.8 || 3.4 || 1.2 || 0.2 || 11.3
|-
| align="left" | 1988–89
| align="left" | Houston
| 14 || 0 || 6.5 || .311 || .222 || .750 || 1.1 || 0.4 || 0.2 || 0.0 || 2.6
|-
| align="left" | 1988–89
| align="left" | Milwaukee
| 29 || 0 || 9.4 || .493 || .286 || .783 || 1.0 || 0.7 || 0.4 || 0.1 || 3.2
|-
| align="left" | 1989–90
| align="left" | Milwaukee
| 61 || 10 || 10.4 || .427 || .250 || .679 || 1.2 || 0.7 || 0.5 || 0.1 || 3.6
|-
| align="left" | 1990–91
| align="left" | Los Angeles
| 7 || 0 || 3.9 || .667 || 1.000 || .000 || 0.6 || 0.4 || 0.0 || 0.0 || 0.7
|-
| align="left" | 1990–91
| align="left" | Utah
| 23 || 0 || 11.6 || .364 || .182 || .870 || 1.7 || 0.6 || 0.2 || 0.0 || 3.4
|-
| align="left" | 1991–92
| align="left" | Los Angeles
| 22 || 0 || 11.5 || .438 || .318 || .621 || 1.3 || 0.7 || 0.5 || 0.0 || 4.7
|-
| align="left" | 1991–92
| align="left" | Seattle
| 35 || 2 || 11.5 || .394 || .293 || .811 || 1.6 || 0.9 || 0.5 || 0.1 || 4.8
|- class="sortbottom"
| style="text-align:center;" colspan="2"| Career
| 360 || 105 || 16.7 || .437 || .259 || .719 || 2.1 || 1.6 || 0.7 || 0.1 || 6.0
|}

Playoffs

|-
| align="left" | 1988–89
| align="left" | Milwaukee
| 6 || 0 || 11.5 || .364 || .000 || .750 || 1.2 || 1.0 || 0.3 || 0.0 || 1.8
|-
| align="left" | 1989–90
| align="left" | Milwaukee
| 2 || 0 || 6.5 || .333 || 1.000 || .000 || 0.0 || 0.0 || 1.0 || 0.0 || 1.5
|-
| align="left" | 1990–91
| align="left" | Utah
| 4 || 0 || 7.3 || .500 || .500 || .000 || 0.8 || 0.3 || 0.0 || 0.0 || 2.3
|-
| align="left" | 1991–92
| align="left" | Seattle
| 5 || 0 || 4.4 || .333 || .250 || .571 || 0.4 || 0.4 || 0.0 || 0.0 || 1.8
|- class="sortbottom"
| style="text-align:center;" colspan="2"| Career
| 17 || 0 || 7.8 || .393 || .375 || .636 || 0.7 || 0.5 || 0.2 || 0.0 || 1.9
|}

Coaching career
After his playing career, Brown worked as an advance scout and college talent evaluator for the Milwaukee Bucks from 1994–1997. He has served as an assistant coach for the Portland Trail Blazers (1997–2001 under Mike Dunleavy), Detroit Pistons (2001–2003 under Rick Carlisle),  and Toronto Raptors (2003–2004 under Kevin O'Neill).

On May 19, 2004, the Boston Celtics hired Brown to be an assistant under head coach Doc Rivers; The Boston Globe reported that Brown would be a "defensive coordinator" in Rivers's staff.  Brown substituted for Rivers on March 19, 2006, as Rivers missed the day's game due to a death in the family. The Celtics defeated the Indiana Pacers 103–88. The Celtics led 72–71 after three quarters and opened the fourth with a 9–0 run with a lineup of reserve players Tony Allen, Gerald Green, Kendrick Perkins, Orien Greene, and Al Jefferson.

Brown returned to the Bucks at the start of the 2007–08 season to be an assistant this time under Larry Krystkowiak. On November 6, 2007, Brown took the helm as fill-in head coach of the Bucks in a 112–85 win over the Toronto Raptors as Krystkowiak missed the game due to his wife going into labor with twins.

The Los Angeles Clippers hired Brown as an assistant in 2009. Brown also filled in for injured Clippers head coach Mike Dunleavy on December 31, 2009, with Los Angeles beating Philadelphia 104–88.

On December 7, 2011, Brown replaced Dwane Casey as assistant coach to the Dallas Mavericks. This was Brown's second time working under Rick Carlisle.

For the 2014–15 season, Brown was hired by the Brooklyn Nets as an assistant to new head coach Lionel Hollins.  He took over as interim head coach after Hollins was fired. On April 18, 2016, he was relieved of the position when the Brooklyn Nets named head coach Kenny Atkinson

Head coaching record

|- 
| style="text-align:left;"|Brooklyn
| style="text-align:left;"|
| 45||11||34|||| style="text-align:center;"|4th in Atlantic||—||—||—||—
| style="text-align:center;"|Missed playoffs
|- class="sortbottom"
| style="text-align:center;" colspan="2"|Career
| 45||11||34|||| ||—||—||—||—||

References

External links
NBA stats @ basketballreference.com
NBA.com: Tony Brown coach file

1960 births
Living people
African-American basketball coaches
African-American basketball players
Albany Patroons players
American expatriate basketball people in Canada
American expatriate basketball people in Italy
American men's basketball coaches
American men's basketball players
Arkansas Razorbacks men's basketball players
Basketball coaches from Illinois
Basketball players from Chicago
Boston Celtics assistant coaches
Brooklyn Nets assistant coaches
Brooklyn Nets head coaches
Chicago Bulls players
Dallas Mavericks assistant coaches
Detroit Pistons assistant coaches
Farragut Career Academy alumni
Houston Rockets players
Indiana Pacers players
Kansas City Sizzlers players
Los Angeles Clippers players
Los Angeles Clippers assistant coaches
Los Angeles Lakers players
Milwaukee Bucks assistant coaches
Milwaukee Bucks players
New Jersey Nets draft picks
New Jersey Nets players
Ohio Mixers players
Pallacanestro Reggiana players
Portland Trail Blazers assistant coaches
Seattle SuperSonics players
Shooting guards
Small forwards
Toronto Raptors assistant coaches
Utah Jazz players
Washington Wizards assistant coaches
21st-century African-American people
20th-century African-American sportspeople